Antipodolycaena is a subgenus of the genus Lycaena which is found only in New Zealand. Antipodolycaena includes four species that are endemic to New Zealand:
Lycaena boldenarum White, 1862 (type species)
Lycaena feredayi (Bates, 1867)
Lycaena rauparaha (Fereday, 1877)
Lycaena salustius (Fabricius, 1793)

References

 
Insect subgenera